Colin "Potato" Forde (born 15 May 1963) is a Barbadian football manager, coach and former footballer.

A midfielder in his playing days, Forde was the manager of the Barbados national football team from 2011 until his resignation in November 2014.

References

1963 births
Living people
Barbados national football team managers
Association football midfielders
Barbadian football managers
Barbadian footballers